The Betting and Lotteries Act, 1934 was an Act of the Parliament of the United Kingdom and had three sections: Betting, Lotteries and Prize Competitions, and General.

The draft bill was presented to parliament on 7 March with the provisions passed on 27 March.

Overview

Betting
Horse racing courses and greyhound tracks were forced to limit their race days to a maximum 104 per annum whereas previously they were able to race on an unlimited basis. On course bookmakers and totalisators were also restricted to betting on a maximum of 104 days per annum.

Power was given to local councils to issue (and revoke or refuse) the betting licences required and the 104 appointed days of trading must be published in advance. The racecourse and tracks were to charge on course bookmakers a specified admission price and it was illegal for under 18 to be involved in any betting organisation.

The issue of street bookmaking was not addressed which the press felt should have been. The restriction to 104 days was primarily brought in due to rapid growth of greyhound tracks after 1927 and the associated gambling implications that had followed.

Lotteries and Prize Competitions
All lotteries were made unlawful with the exemption of small lotteries incidental to certain entertainment and private lotteries. Restrictions were made on certain prize competitions (i.e. in newspapers) and warrant rights were given to any constable to investigate premises that are suspected of breaking the restrictions.

This was primarily directed to combat the Irish Free State Hospitals' Sweepstake.

The Official Act Sections

Part 1 - Betting
1. Restriction of betting on tracks.
2. Restriction of bookmaking on tracks.
3. Restriction of pari mutuel or pool betting.
4. Restriction of betting on dog racecourses.
5. Licensing authorities.
6. Notices of, and procedure with respect to, applications for licences.
7. Discretion of licensing authority as to, grant of licences.
8. Special provisions as to first licences for certain existing tracks.
9. Duration and transfer of licences and fees in respect of licences and transfers.
10. Fixing of days on which betting facilities may be provided.
11. Establishment of totalisators on dog racecourses.
12. Facilities for bookmaking on tracks.
13. Charges to bookmakers on tracks 'where betting facilities are lawfully provided.
14. Occupiers of tracks not to have an interest in bookmaking thereon.
15. Betting with young persons, and employment of young persons in betting businesses, prohibited on tracks.
16. Revocation of licences.
17. Saving for right of occupier of track to prohibit betting. 
18. Amendment and interpretation of Racecourse Betting Act, 1928.
19. Power of entry on tracks.
20. Interpretation of Part I.

Part 2 - Lotteries and Prize Competitions
21. Illegality of lotteries.
22. Offences in connection with lotteries.
23. Exemption of small lotteries incidental to certain entertainments.
24. Exemption of private lotteries.
25. Amendment of the law with respect to, and saving for, lotteries of Art Unions.
26. Restriction on certain prize competitions.
27. Power to issue search warrant.
28. Interpretation of Part II.

Part 3 - General
29. Offences by bodies corporate.
30. Penalties for offences under this Act, and forfeitures.
31. Application to Scotland.
32. Repeal.
33. Short title, commencement and extent.

See also
 History of gambling in the United Kingdom

References

Gambling in the United Kingdom
Lotteries